Subarna Jwarchan is a Nepalese politician currently serving as a member of parliament at the House of Representatives for Nepali Congress as a list MP. She was elected to the parliament as a replacement for Gyan Kumari Chhantyal who had died.

References 

Nepal MPs 2017–2022
Living people
Nepali Congress politicians from Lumbini Province
1946 births
Members of the 2nd Nepalese Constituent Assembly